Somerville is a town in Morgan County, Alabama, United States. It is included in the Decatur Metropolitan Area and the Huntsville-Decatur Combined Statistical Area. As of the 2020 census, the population of the town was 796.

History
Somerville was the county seat of Morgan County from 1818 to 1891, when the seat was moved to Decatur. The town was named for Robert M. Summerville, an officer killed in 1814 during the Creek War. Initially incorporated on December 3, 1819, it is a few days older than the state. After its loss of the county seat in the 1890s, its incorporation lapsed. It was reorganized (reincorporated) on December 1, 1955.

Geography
Somerville is located in central Morgan County at  (34.469961, -86.798782), along Alabama State Route 67, which leads northwest  to Decatur and southeast  to the edge of Baileyton.

Somerville is drained by Town Creek, which flows east to Cotaco Creek, a north-flowing tributary of the Tennessee River.

Demographics

As of the census of 2000, there were 347 people, 148 households, and 97 families residing in the town. The racial makeup of the town was 91.35% White, 5.76% Black or African American, 1.73% Native American, 0.29% from other races, and 0.86% from two or more races. 0.58% of the population were Hispanic or Latino of any race.

There were 148 households, out of which 28.4% had children under the age of 18 living with them, 51.4% were married couples living together, 11.5% had a female householder with no husband present, and 33.8% were non-families. 29.7% of all households were made up of individuals, and 8.8% had someone living alone who was 65 years of age or older. The average household size was 2.34 and the average family size was 2.92.

In the town, the population was spread out, with 22.5% under the age of 18, 11.2% from 18 to 24, 33.1% from 25 to 44, 22.5% from 45 to 64, and 10.7% who were 65 years of age or older. The median age was 36 years. For every 100 females, there were 94.9 males. For every 100 females age 18 and over, there were 103.8 males.

The median income for a household in the town was $26,250, and the median income for a family was $31,250. Males had a median income of $29,107 versus $18,958 for females. The per capita income for the town was $13,747. About 13.3% of families and 13.7% of the population were below the poverty line, including 11.0% of those under age 18 and 32.1% of those age 65 or over.

Mayor and city council

Mayor
Darren Tucker

City Council
Place 1: Josh Melson
Place 2: Ron Jones
Place 3: Michael Rea
Place 4: Carl Flemons
Place 5: Jackie Teague

Notable people
Josiah Patterson, congressman from 1891 to 1897
Malcolm R. Patterson, governor of Tennessee from 1907 to 1911
Joseph Humphrey Sloss, congressman from 1871 to 1875
Ryan Williams, theoretical computer scientist
Gary Winton, former basketball player for the United States Military Academy

References

External links

Towns in Alabama
Towns in Morgan County, Alabama
Decatur metropolitan area, Alabama
Huntsville-Decatur, AL Combined Statistical Area